Harris Academy Bermondsey is a secondary school located in the district of Bermondsey in the London Borough of Southwark, England. The school takes in girls between the ages of 11 and 18. In 2006 the school joined a federation of schools in South London called the Harris Federation named after the Lord Harris of Peckham who is sponsoring them. Prior to its transformation into an academy, the school was known as Aylwin Girls' School. The 'Aylwin Grammar School for Girls' was founded on the site in 1906, and was one of the first offering a free grammar school education to girls in the country.  The school also takes part in fundraising for annual trips to Sri Lanka in association with the Yala Fund, a charity which helps build and improve schools in towns in Sri Lanka.

Location 
The academy is located on the A2206, on Southwark Park Road. The nearest train station is South Bermondsey, which is on the South London Line and connects to Peckham and Crystal Palace, with a new station, New Bermondsey, possible on the proposed London Overground East London Line connecting to Clapham Junction. The nearest tube station, Bermondsey on the Jubilee line, is located on Jamaica Road.

Uniform 
The uniform changed in 2006 along with the name. Pupils were asked to decide what colours they wanted to wear on their uniforms and it was decided, through a vote, that pink was the most suitable colour. So the uniform since 2006 has changed to a navy skirt or trousers, navy suit jacket, long or short-sleeved pink open-neck Academy blouse, dark navy or black shoes, plain white, black or blue socks, plain dark tights and academy dark-coloured coat. This is now for the whole school, but the school bag is not optional for 7, 8, 9, and 10 and 11. It is only optional for years 12 above

Student clubs 
Harris Academy Bermondsey has a lineup of clubs that mainly focus on media and enterprise, but also include other subject areas. Here is a full list of the clubs available at the academy:

Harris Federation 

The Harris Federation of South London schools is a federation of academies in three South London boroughs. There are fourteen schools in the federation, with plans for more. The schools are all sponsored by the Lord Harris of Peckham, who is investing around £2 million into them to make new facilities and for re-development of certain schools.

References

External links 
 Harris Academy Bermondsey
 Harris Federation
 Student radio station

Girls' schools in London
Academies in the London Borough of Southwark
Secondary schools in the London Borough of Southwark
Bermondsey
Bermondsey
2006 establishments in England
Educational institutions established in 2006